Roman Jebavý and Jiří Veselý were the defending champions, but Veselý decided not to participate this year. Jebavý played alongside Adam Pavlásek, but they lost to Dino Marcan and Antonio Šančić in the quarterfinals.

Mateusz Kowalczyk and Igor Zelenay won the tournament, defeating Roberto Maytín and Miguel Ángel Reyes-Varela in the final, 6–2, 7–6(7–5).

Seeds

Draw

External links
 Main Draw

Sparta Prague Open - Doubles
2015 Doubles